Bonnie Brae Street in the Westlake and Pico-Union districts of Central Los Angeles, is connected with two topics:
South Bonnie Brae Tract Historic District
Azusa Street Revival